From April 13 to 16, 2012, a major tornado outbreak occurred across a large portion of the Great Plains. The storms resulted in six tornado-related fatalities, all of which occurred as a result of a nighttime EF3 tornado that caused major damage in and around Woodward, Oklahoma. Numerous other tornadoes occurred, including a violent EF4 tornado that passed near Marquette, Kansas, and an EF3 that caused major damage in Wichita.

Meteorological synopsis
An impressive low pressure area and associated trough began tracking into the Great Plains on April 13, and a slight risk of severe weather was issued. The outlook mentioned the possibility of tornadoes, including the risk for isolated strong tornadoes. No strong tornadoes occurred, though an EF1 tornado caused considerable damage in Norman, Oklahoma.

For only the second time in history (previously for April 7, 2006), a day two high risk   of severe weather was issued by the Storm Prediction Center. In the discussion, the SPC stated that a major tornado outbreak was likely across central Kansas and north-central Oklahoma during the afternoon and overnight hours of April 14, with long-tracked violent tornadoes likely. It was later expanded to include a second high risk area across much of Nebraska, where a rare 45% tornado probability was given during the late morning update on April 13.  During the morning hours on the 14th, the high risk area was expanded again to combine the two separate areas into a single large one. Later in the day, the 45% tornado probability was shifted from Nebraska south to Kansas and northern Oklahoma. A large outbreak of tornadoes impacted the Great Plains states on April 14, and several PDS tornado warnings were issued during the outbreak. Initially, most of the tornadoes were small or remained over open country, though more significant tornado activity began to develop throughout the day. A high-end EF2 tornado struck Creston, Iowa, flipping vehicles and causing major structural damage to homes and other buildings in town. Another EF2 wedge tornado struck Thurman, Iowa, damaging 75% of the town. In Nebraska, a strong EF2 tornado destroyed outbuildings and badly damaged a home near Cook, while a large and violent EF4 tornado leveled a home and debarked trees near Marquette, Kansas. Later that evening, a cyclic supercell thunderstorm developed in northern Oklahoma before moving into southern Kansas, producing multiple tornadoes along the way. This included a large EF3 wedge tornado that destroyed homes near Conway Springs. As this supercell moved into Wichita around 10:15 pm CDT (0315 UTC), another large EF3 wedge tornado touched down and caused major damage in the southeastern part of the city. Staff at the Wichita National Weather Service Weather Forecast Office at Wichita Mid-Continent Airport were forced to hand over responsibility for their County Warning Area to the National Weather Service office in Topeka and take shelter at about 10:00 pm CDT (0300 UTC), returning to duty half an hour later. Another supercell thunderstorm also produced two EF3 wedge tornadoes that passed near Fellsburg and Hudson, causing significant damage.

Around 10:00 p.m. CDT (0300 UTC), a broken squall line began to form across the eastern portions of the Texas and Oklahoma panhandles; a thunderstorm developed ahead of the northern line segment in northwestern Wheeler County, Texas, at approximately 10:30 p.m. CDT (0330 UTC), and began developing supercell characteristics as it tracked northeastward into the Oklahoma counties of Ellis and Roger Mills. This high-end EF3 tornado later struck Woodward, Oklahoma, at 12:20 am CDT (0520 UTC), killing six people. Multiple homes and businesses were destroyed in Woodward, and all fatalities occurred as a result of destroyed mobile homes. Additional weak tornadoes occurred on April 15 and 16 before the outbreak came to an end.

Confirmed tornadoes

April 13 event

April 14 event

April 15 event

April 16 event

Haysville–McConnell Air Force Base–Eastern Wichita, Kansas

Originating in the Texas Panhandle, the supercell thunderstorm that produced this destructive nighttime EF3 tornado had a history of producing tornadoes in Oklahoma as early as 6:15 pm. The cyclic supercell storm produced additional tornadoes as it continued into south-central Kansas, including an EF3 that passed near Argonia and Conway Springs. As the supercell moved into the Wichita metropolitan area, a tornado touched down in the southern part of Haysville, moving through the eastern part of town along a northeasterly path. Damage in Haysville ranged from EF0 to EF1 in intensity as homes sustained damage to roofs, windows, and garage doors. Trees were also downed, some of which landed on houses. Farther to the northeast, additional minor to moderate damage occurred as the tornado approached the southeastern city limits of Wichita. By this time, local news stations and storm spotters were reporting a large wedge tornado moving into southeastern Wichita, accompanied by numerous power flashes. Staff at the Wichita National Weather Service Weather Forecast Office on the western perimeter of the Wichita Mid-Continent Airport were forced to hand over responsibility for their County Warning Area to the National Weather Service office in Topeka and take shelter at about 10:00 pm CDT (0300 UTC), due to the close proximity of the predicted tornado track to their location. While within their shelter room, the NWS Wichita staff used a laptop computer and personal smartphones to continue to monitor the tornado on radar. The tornado ended up passing within six miles of the facility at its closest point, and the staff returned to duty half an hour later. The tornado reached EF3 intensity as it entered Wichita, tearing directly through the Oaklawn-Sunview neighborhood. Major damage occurred in this residential area, as numerous one-story homes were severely damaged or destroyed, including many that lost roofs and exterior walls. One home was leveled, and many large trees were snapped, defoliated, and denuded.

Some of the most significant damage in this area occurred at the Pinaire Mobile Home Park, where 90 of the 150 mobile homes were damaged, several of which were completely destroyed. Ruptured gas lines in the mobile home park resulted in a fire, and several residents were left trapped in the rubble, but were later rescued. Despite the severity of the damage, no fatalities occurred at the Pinaire Mobile Home Park or anywhere else along the path of the tornado. Continuing to the northeast, the tornado weakened to EF2 strength and struck Spirit AeroSystems, Wichita's largest employer. Every building at the facility sustained some degree of damage, and six of the buildings sustained significant damage. One of these buildings was largely destroyed. At nearby McConnell Air Force Base, hangars and fences were heavily damaged, and airplanes were damaged at the Kansas Aviation Museum. Past McConnell Air Force Base, the tornado weakened to EF1 strength and passed near the intersection of Rock Road and East Pawnee Street, snapping power poles and toppling a billboard over onto a nearby building. Minor tree, fence, and house damage occurred in residential areas along this segment of the path, and an apartment building had a large portion of its roof torn off. At the East Harry Street and South Webb Road intersection, a QuikTrip, Dillons, Walgreens, and several other businesses sustained EF0 to EF1 damage. Continuing to the northeast, EF0 to EF1 damage continued as the tornado passed near the intersection of Greenwich Road and East Kellogg Avenue, blowing the windows out of vehicles at a car dealership and causing roof damage to the Hawker Beechcraft facility. A large ferris wheel was toppled over in the parking lot of Morningstar Community Church, where a fair had been taking place earlier in the day. Additional minor tree and house damage occurred before the tornado dissipated to the west of Andover, after injuring 38 people and causing $500 million in damage. The path of this tornado bore a striking resemblance to the track of an F5 tornado that killed 17 people in Sedgwick and Butler counties on April 26, 1991.

Arnett–Woodward, Oklahoma

CDT on April 14, this deadly EF3 nighttime tornado was the only tornado of the outbreak that resulted in any fatalities. After touching down, the tornado rapidly intensified and continued through sparsely populated areas to the northeast of Arnett, destroying two homes and causing lesser damage to a few others. Damage along this segment of the path was rated EF3. The tornado tracked northeastward into Woodward County, Oklahoma, around 11:59 p.m. CDT, producing EF2 damage. Power lines were downed and two mobile homes were completely destroyed to the southeast of Fargo, killing three people. Illuminated by lightning and power flashes, the large stovepipe tornado entered the southwestern part of Woodward at 12:19 a.m. CDT on April 15. The first area impacted in Woodward was a subdivision along Quail Drive and Meadowlake Drive. EF3 damage occurred in this areas as numerous homes were damaged or destroyed, some of which were left with only a few interior walls standing. Large trees were defoliated, snapped, and denuded, and vehicles were tossed and severely damaged. The tornado reached high-end EF3 strength as it moved through neighborhoods just to the west of 34th Street, where multiple homes had roofs ripped off and sustained collapse of exterior walls. One two-story home was completely flattened with only a pile of rubble left behind, though overall context was not indicative of a tornado exceeding high-end EF3 intensity. EF3 damage continued just beyond this point as one-story condominium buildings along Lakeside Lane were destroyed. One of the buildings at the complex was leveled, though the structures were not well-anchored to their foundations. A carpet store housed in a large retail building in this area also sustained EF3 damage, sustaining total roof loss and collapse of multiple exterior walls, with metal support beams bent. A nearby movie theater building was badly damaged as well.

The tornado then crossed Oklahoma Avenue, snapping trees and bending metal street signs to the ground. The Mutual of Omaha Customer Service Center, housed in a large and well-built office building, was impacted at low-end EF3 intensity. The structure sustained many blown out windows, roof loss, major damage to its interior, and partial exterior wall failure. Large amounts of debris was scattered throughout the area, and small ornamental trees on the property sustained some debarking. Farther to the northeast, the tornado maintained its strength as it ripped through residential areas in western Woodward, severely damaging or completely destroying many homes in the vicinity of Cheyenne Drive, Choctaw Court, and Ridgecrest Avenue. Past this area, the tornado struck the Hideaway Mobile Home Park along 26th Street in the northwestern part of town, resulting in devastating damage. Three people were killed as several mobile homes were obliterated, with their metal frames thrown and mangled. Debris was scattered in all directions, vehicles were tossed, and ground scouring was noted at the mobile home park. The tornado then exited Woodward and weakened, moving through open country before lifting at around 12:26 a.m.

The 20 outdoor warning sirens located throughout Woodward did not sound prior to the tornado striking the town. This was due to lightning strike damage from the previous day sustained to a tower used to activate the local electricity-powered siren warning system. As a result, most Woodward area residents had to rely on warnings either from local television stations broadcasting from the Oklahoma City market through cable and satellite television or NOAA Weather Radio All Hazards.

Aftermath
On April 15, 2012, Kansas Governor Sam Brownback declared a state of emergency for the entire state due to the tornadoes, straight-line winds, hail and flash flooding. Oklahoma Governor Mary Fallin declared a state of emergency the following day on April 16 for twelve Oklahoma counties (Alfalfa, Caddo, Canadian, Cleveland, Ellis, Harper, Jackson, Kiowa, Logan, Oklahoma, Woods and Woodward).

On April 18, Fallin filed a federal disaster declaration request for Woodward County with the Federal Emergency Management Agency, seeking government funding to provide temporary housing, low-interest loans, disaster unemployment assistance and disaster expense grants for people and businesses affected by the storms; officials for the Governor's office stated that if the request is granted, additional Oklahoma counties currently included in the state of emergency declaration may be added to the federal disaster declaration.

On April 19, 2012, FEMA announced that the southwestern Iowa counties of Union and Fremont that were also affected by the tornadoes would not qualify for federal assistance, both counties also received state disaster declarations by Governor Terry Branstad. FEMA denied the disaster declaration request for the twelve Oklahoma counties the following day on April 20. The Small Business Administration accepted a separate disaster declaration request filed by Governor Fallin for Woodward County on April 26; the declaration will allow the SBA to provide low-interest disaster loans for renters, homeowners, business owners and non-profits to repair or replace storm-damaged property not covered by insurance or other federal assistance programs.

See also
List of North American tornadoes and tornado outbreaks

Notes

References

External links
For the latest severe weather information:
National Weather Service
Storm Prediction Center

Storm Reports:
 Time lapse visualization of the April 14th tornado outbreak
 97 tornadoes leave a mess across Kansas, list of damage, links to photos; KWCH tv; April 15, 2012.
 EF-4 Tornado levels Ellsworth County home; KWCH tv; April 15, 2012.
 Storm slams into Saline County hog farm; KWCH tv; April 15, 2012.

04-13
Tornadoes in Kansas
Tornadoes in Oklahoma
History of Wichita, Kansas
Tornado